Neil Farrell Jr. (born September 9, 1998) is an American football defensive tackle for the Las Vegas Raiders of the National Football League (NFL). He played college football at LSU and was drafted by the Raiders in the fourth round of the 2022 NFL Draft.

Early life and high school
Farrell grew up in Mobile, Alabama and attended Murphy High School. As a senior, Farrell recorded 101 tackles, 28 for a loss, 13 sacks, and 14 quarterback hurries. Farrell was rated a four-star recruit and committed to play college football at LSU over offers from Michigan, Alabama, Florida, USC, and South Carolina and signed with the team despite a late recruiting push by Florida State.

College career
Farrell played in the first five games of his freshman season and recorded five tackles with one quarterback hurry before suffering an injury. Farrell played in all 15 of LSU's games with three starts as a sophomore and had 46 tackles, seven tackles for loss, and three sacks as the Tigers won the 2020 College Football Playoff National Championship.

Farrell initially announced that he would opt-out of his senior season due to family health concerns regarding Covid-19, but later reversed his decision. Farrell finished the season with 25 tackles, 2.5 tackles for loss, 1.0 sacks, and 1 forced fumble. After considering entering the 2021 NFL draft, he decided to utilize the extra year of eligibility granted to college athletes who played in the 2020 season due to the coronavirus pandemic and return to LSU for a fifth season. Farrell finished the 2021 season with 45 tackles, 9.5 tackles for loss, and two sacks. After the conclusion of his college career, he played in the 2022 Senior Bowl and was named the best defensive lineman for the American Team.

Professional career

Farrell was drafted by the Las Vegas Raiders in the fourth round, 126th overall, of the 2022 NFL Draft.

References

External links
 Las Vegas Raiders bio
LSU Tigers bio

1998 births
Living people
Players of American football from Alabama
Sportspeople from Mobile, Alabama
American football defensive tackles
LSU Tigers football players
Las Vegas Raiders players